Bachchan is a 2014 Bengali comedy thriller directed by Raja Chanda and produced and distributed under the banners of Reliance Entertainment and Grassroot Entertainment Pvt. Ltd. The film feature actors Jeet, Aindrita Ray and Payel Sarkar in the lead roles. It is the official remake of the 2011 Kannada film Vishnuvardhana.

Plot
Bacchu a.k.a. Bijay is an die-hard fan of Amitabh Bachchan, who kept the later's name Vijay (from the film Coolie) and also adopted the surname of the legend. Bijay is the son of a washerman Ramesh, who doesn't want to be like his father, but dreams of earning million bucks. He has an astrologer friend Shankar who predicts his future and tells him that his fortunes would change. While delivering the clothes washed and ironed by his father, to a retired Colonel, he falls in love with the latter's younger daughter Priy. Bijay finds out that Priya was set to meet Dr.Partho Sarathi Chatterjee, a suitor as instructed by her father. Bijay, with his friend Shankar, reach the hospital and pretend to be a doctor to Priya trying to gently woo her. After some hilarious situations, Priya realizes Bijay's true identity, but soon finding his antics adorable, forgives him and also reciprocates his feelings. 
One day riding through the streets, Bijay gets into a tussle with few goons and is arrested. Later, he discovers that the goons are the henchmen of an Underworld King named Master. Bijay, hiding behind a chair, requests the police officer not to reveal him to Master. After being released from the police station, Bijay finds a mobile phone which had accidentally fallen from Master's pocket. Master, gets a call from his own mobile phone and the unknown caller offers to return the phone. But Bijay, who is the unknown caller demands money for it. Master tries all means to get the phone from Bijay, containing a video starring Police Commissioner Dibakar Saha by which he could blackmail the commissioner to hide the files of Master from everyone. On the other hand, Bijay extracts money from master doing various things(such as kidnapping Master's brother etc.). The twist in this cat and mouse game comes in the form of Trisha, who wants Master to be killed due to some reasons. 
The rest of the film discloses the secrets regarding the video of the cellphone, the reasons for what Trisha want Master to be killed and at last what Bijay does after hearing the secrets disclosed by Trisha.

Cast 
 Jeet as Bijoy Bachchan
 Aindrita Ray as Priya
 Payel Sarkar as Trisha
 Kanchan Mullick as astrologer Shankar Ghoshal, Bijay's Friend
 Kharaj Mukherjee as Retired Colonel, Priya's Father
 Ashish Vidyarthi as Police Commissioner Dibakar Saha
 Mukul Dev as Underworld King Master
 Somnath Kar as Master's henchman
 Supriyo Dutta  as Ramesh, Bijay's Father
 Saheb Chatterjee as Dr. Partha Sarathi Chatterjee (Cameo appearance)
 Subhashree Ganguly in an Item number song "Latai" (Special appearance)

Production

Development 
Bachchan is produced jointly under the banners of Reliance Entertainment and Grassroot Entertainment. It is the remake of the 2011 Kannada film, Vishnuvardhana, which starred Sudeep , Bhavana and Priyamani in the lead roles.

The plot consists of an interesting incident, which is centered around Amitabh Bachchan. This justifies the very naming of the film, according to director Raja Chanda.

Casting 
Bachchan marks the Bengali debut of Kannada actress Aindrita Ray, who was signed for this film to play the character of the female lead opposite Jeet. She confirmed that she was playing the role which was played by Bhavana in Vishnuvardhana. Regarding her casting, Aindrita said, "It is a complete coincidence that my first Bengali film happens to be a remake of a Kannada film. I think this symbolizes me, for these are the two languages that I connect most to. The hero, director and banner are the best that Tollywood can offer. I couldn't think of anything bigger in terms of a debut.Bachchan also marks the first pairing of two renowned Tollywood faces, Jeet and Payel Sarkar. According to Payel, her role in the film is a vital one and there is a depth in that character.
Mukul Dev was also confirmed as a main antagonist in the movie. He is the first choice of the director and producer after his strong main antagonist role in 2012 Bengali Blockbuster movie Awara With Jeet.
Subhashree Ganguly was also confirmed to make a special appearance in an item number.

Filming 
Filming of Bachchan started from 6 November 2013. Shooting locations include a shopping mall at Howrah.All the song videos will be shot out of India. Some video songs are shot in Portugal.

Soundtrack

Critical response
Upam Buzarbaruah of The Times of India rated it  and told "Bachchan is a film you can watch if you like going brain-dead for a couple of hours after a hectic day. It's an entertainer through and through".

Now Running rated it  and commented "Bachchan is a power packed entertainment. Pick your seat and just hold on to your seats for the next two hours, as the screen explodes with colours of love and sweat of action."

References

External links
 

2014 films
Bengali remakes of Kannada films
Bengali-language Indian films
2010s Bengali-language films
Films scored by Jeet Ganguly
Indian comedy thriller films
Films shot in Portugal
Films shot in Kolkata
2014 masala films
Films set in Kolkata
Reliance Entertainment films
Films directed by Raja Chanda